Granada High School is a public high school located at 400 Wall Street in Livermore, California, United States. It is part of the Livermore Valley Joint Unified School District. Granada was established as the town's second public high school in response to significant population growth in the 1960s. Livermore High School was the first high school in Livermore, and rivals Granada. The name Granada is a Spanish word meaning "pomegranate". The school's official newspaper is called The Pomegranate, which is published monthly. The school mascot is a matador.

History
Granada High School is located in the midst of housing tracts in Livermore, which changed from an agrarian community to a growing suburban community at the end of World War II. This change was escalated by the development of the research laboratory that started in the 1950s as a reaction to the United States' role as a nuclear power. The Lawrence Livermore National Laboratory is still a major employer in the community. The growth of the Bay Area as a leader in the area of technology has also changed the nature of the community, as has the recent development of the local wine industry.

Athletics
As of 2023, Granada High School has teams in 15 sports: cross country, football, golf, tennis, volleyball, water polo, basketball, soccer, wrestling, baseball, lacrosse, softball, swimming and diving (one joint team), and track and field. These teams compete in the North Coast Section CIF (NCS) and East Bay Athletic League (EBAL).

Baseball team
Between 2009 and 2015, Granada's baseball team compiled a 111–68 record while heading the Matadors.

In 2013, the team finished the season with a record of 24–2, making it to the semifinals in the North Coast Section playoffs. The team featured San Francisco Giants draftee Ryan Kirby and former Miami Marlins minor leaguer Casey Soltis. The Matadors began the season with 20 consecutive victories, outscoring their opponents 190-39 over the course of the 26-game season.  The team had a 13–1 record in their league games, as they won the East Bay Athletic league for the first time since the 1980s. The team was ranked as high as second in the nation by MaxPreps during the course of the season.

Notable alumni

 Louie Aguiar, former football punter
 George Atkinson III, former football running back for the Cleveland Browns and Oakland Raiders
 Mark Davis, former Major League pitcher; 1989 National League Cy Young Award winner
 James DePaiva, actor
 Brandon Gonzáles, boxer
 Brian Johnson, retired soccer midfielder
 Tony Sanchez, Former Head football Coach for UNLV
 Erick Threets, Major League relief pitcher, originally with the San Francisco Giants, and Colorado Rockies
 Jack Trudeau, former professional football player; selected by the Indianapolis Colts in the second round of the 1986 NFL Draft; quarterback from the University of Illinois' played in 10 NFL seasons, 1986-1995
 Josh Cooley, director of Toy Story 4
 Jimmy O’Brien (Jomboy), baseball personality

See also
Alameda County high schools

References

External links
Official website
School newspaper
Granada baseball official website
Livermore Valley Joint Unified School District

High schools in Alameda County, California
Livermore, California
Public high schools in California
Educational institutions established in 1963
1963 establishments in California